Events in the year 1000 in Norway.

Incumbents
Monarch - Olaf I Tryggvason then Sweyn Forkbeard

Events

Leif Ericson lands in North America, calling it Vinland. This journey became the first European journey in which the continents of the Americas were discovered by European inhabitants, many years before the discovery of America by Christopher Columbus.
September 9 - Battle of Svolder.

Deaths
 probable:
Olaf Tryggvason, King of Norway (b. 968).

References

Norway